Pingasa dispensata is a moth of the family Geometridae first described by Francis Walker in 1860. It is found in India, Sulawesi and Africa.

The larvae have been recorded feeding on the leaves of Ziziphus jujuba.

Subspecies
Pingasa dispensata dispensata (India)
Pingasa dispensata celata (Walker, 1866) (Sulawesi)
Pingasa dispensata delotypa Prout, 1935 (Bioko)
Pingasa distensaria distensaria (Walker, 1860) (Burundi, Cameroon, Kenya, Rwanda, South Africa, Tanzania, Uganda, Zimbabwe)
Pingasa distensaria respondens (Walker, 1860) (South Africa)

References

Moths described in 1860
Pseudoterpnini
Moths of Africa